Dan Sudick is a special effects supervisor. Sudick and his fellow visual effects artists were nominated for an Academy Award for Best Visual Effects for Master and Commander: The Far Side of the World, War of the Worlds, Iron Man, Iron Man 2, The Avengers, Iron Man 3, Captain America: The Winter Soldier, Guardians of the Galaxy Vol. 2, Avengers: Infinity War, Avengers: Endgame, Free Guy and Spider-Man: No Way Home.

Filmography

Films

Television

References

External links
 

Living people
Best Visual Effects BAFTA Award winners
Year of birth missing (living people)
Visual effects artists